Bajánsenye is a village in Vas County, Hungary.

Populated places in Vas County